Ń (minuscule: ń) is a letter formed by putting an acute accent over the letter N. In the Belarusian Łacinka alphabet; the alphabets of Polish, Kashubian, Wymysorys and the Sorbian languages; and the romanization of Khmer, it represents ,which is the same as Czech and Slovak ň, Serbo-Croatian and Albanian nj, Spanish and Galician ñ, Italian and French gn, Hungarian and Catalan ny, and Portuguese nh. In Yoruba, it represents a syllabic /n/ with a high tone, and it often connects a pronoun to a verb: for example, when using the pronoun for "I" with the verb for "to eat", the resulting expression is mo ń jeun.

Usage

Polish

In Polish, it appears directly after  in the alphabet, but no Polish word begins with this letter, because it may not appear before a vowel (the letter may appear only before a consonant or in the word-final position). In the former case, a digraph  is used to indicate .

Examples
  (April)
  (disgrace)
  (sky, heaven)
  (food)
  (hand)
  (sun)

Cantonese
It is used in the Yale romanisation of Cantonese when the nasal syllable  has a rising tone.

Lule Sami
Traditionally  has been used in Lule Sami to represent .  However in modern orthography, such as signage in Lule Sami by the Swedish government,  is used instead.

Kazakh
In Kazakh, it was proposed in 2018 to replace the Cyrillic Ң by this Latin alphabet and represents . The replace suggestion has modified to Ŋ in 2019; and in 2021, it was suggested to replace with Ñ.

Computer use 
HTML characters and Unicode code point numbers:
 Ń: &#323; or &#x143; – U+0143
 ń: &#324; or &#x144; – U+0144
In Unicode, Ń and ń are located the  "Latin Extended-A" block.

See also 
 Acute accent

References

Latin letters with diacritics
Polish letters with diacritics